The 1974 Alabama gubernatorial election took place on November 5, 1974. Incumbent Democratic Governor George Wallace was reelected in a landslide over his Republican opponent, businessman Elvin McCary. Wallace was the first Alabama governor to win election to a second consecutive term, as the state's Constitution was amended in 1968 to allow governors to serve a maximum two elected consecutive terms. This was also Wallace's first campaign after having been paralyzed following being shot by Arthur Bremer in an assassination attempt during Wallace's run for the 1972 Democratic presidential nomination.

Democratic primary
Primary elections were held on May 7, 1974.

Candidates
 Jim Folsom, former Governor
 Gene McLain, former State Representative
 Shorty Price, perennial candidate
 Thomas Robinson
 George Wallace, incumbent Governor

Results

Republican primary
 Elvin McCary, businessman

Results

References

Bibliography
 
 

1974
Gubernatorial
Alabama
Alabama gubernatorial election
George Wallace